The Caldwell House is a historic house at Smith and East 2nd Streets in McRae, Arkansas.  It is a single story wood-frame structure with Craftsman styling.  Its main gable faces front, with a projecting side gable section to the right, behind a porch supported by sloping posts on brick piers.  Built about 1925, it is the community's finest example of Craftsman architecture.

The house was listed on the National Register of Historic Places in 1991.

See also
National Register of Historic Places listings in White County, Arkansas

References

Houses on the National Register of Historic Places in Arkansas
Houses completed in 1925
Houses in White County, Arkansas
National Register of Historic Places in White County, Arkansas
American Craftsman architecture in Arkansas
Bungalow architecture in Arkansas
1925 establishments in Arkansas